Gelting was an Amt ("collective municipality") in the district of Schleswig-Flensburg, in Schleswig-Holstein, Germany. The seat of the Amt was in Gelting. In January 2008, it was merged with the Amt Steinbergkirche to form the Amt Geltinger Bucht.

The Amt Gelting consisted of the following municipalities:

Gelting
Hasselberg 
Kronsgaard 
Maasholm 
Nieby 
Pommerby 
Rabel 
Rabenholz 
Stangheck 
Stoltebüll

Former Ämter in Schleswig-Holstein